Rhodri ap Hyfaidd (died 905) was briefly the king of Dyfed.  After his brother Llywarch was killed by Hywel Dda and his father Cadell, Rhodri reigned briefly before he himself was killed and the throne was usurped by Hywel, under whom the kingdom then merged with Seisyllwg to form Deheubarth).

See also
Kings of Wales family trees

10th-century Welsh monarchs
Monarchs of Dyfed
9th-century births
905 deaths
Year of birth unknown

de:Rhodri